Rear Admiral Sir Ronald Stephen Forrest,  (11 January 1923 – 25 March 2005) was a senior Royal Navy officer who served as Defence Services Secretary from 1972 to 1975.

Naval career
Educated at Belhaven Hill School and the Royal Naval College, Dartmouth, Forrest joined the Royal Navy in 1940 and saw action in the Second World War. He became Director of Seaman Officer Appointments at the Ministry of Defence in 1968, Commanding Officer of the destroyer  in 1970 and Defence Services Secretary in 1972 before retiring in 1975.

In retirement he became Commander of the St John Ambulance in Devon.

Subsequently, he led the effort to purchase land for the Westpoint Arena near Exeter, in order to host the Devon County Show. He escorted Her Majesty Queen Elizabeth II during her visit to the Show in 1995, by which time the main ring had been named the Forrest Ring.

Family
In 1947 he married Patricia Russell; they had two sons and one daughter. Following the death of his first wife, he married June Perks (née Weaver). Lady Forrest died in 2012.

References

 

1923 births
2005 deaths
People educated at Belhaven Hill School
Graduates of Britannia Royal Naval College
Royal Navy officers of World War II
Royal Navy rear admirals
Knights Commander of the Royal Victorian Order